Trevor McFur in the Crescent Galaxy is a horizontally scrolling shooter video game developed by Flare II and originally published by Atari Corporation for the Atari Jaguar first in North America on November 23, 1993. It was, aside from the pack-in game Cybermorph, the only launch title for the system in the region. It was also released in Europe on June 27, 1994 and finally in Japan on January 13, 1995 where it was published by Mumin Corporation.

When the Crescent Galaxy has been conquered by a strange entity, the main armada units from the interplanetary defense squad Circle Reserves were dispatched but almost all of them were nearly destroyed when battling against it. Trevor McFur, a corporal from the reserve alongside his partner Cutter, warp to their home in order to counterattack the unknown entity, referred only as Odd-It and its own armada to free the planets and the galaxy from his grasp, before it makes everything odd like himself. Being one of the first titles released for the system, Trevor McFur in the Crescent Galaxy is believed to have been originally in development for the unreleased Atari Panther console and was moved to the Jaguar when the project was terminated.

Trevor McFur in the Crescent Galaxy received mixed reception when it launched from reviewers who praised the graphics but most of them were divided in regards to the gameplay and controls, while others criticized the lack of in-game music, lack of depth and sound effects. By April 1, 1995, the game had sold nearly 24,000 copies, though it is unknown how many were sold in total during its lifetime.

Gameplay 

Trevor McFur in the Crescent Galaxy is a horizontally scrolling shoot 'em up game where players take the role of corporal Trevor McFur from the Circle Reserves in a mission to defeat the entity known as Odd-It, by destroying the four moons orbiting around the planet Cosmolite in order to get into the main base of the enemy. The player has multiple continues to keep playing until they run out and the cartridge's EEPROM only saves high-scores and other settings.

Unlike most of its contemporaries, the player can choose between any of the four starting moons and each one consists of two stages with a boss at the end of each stage. The player's ship has three types of weapons at his disposal: the main cannon, whose firepower can be increased up to six times; the bomb, which can also be increased multiple times; and the special weapons, which are either selected by pressing Option and activated by pressing the C button, or directly activated at any given time by pressing their corresponding number on the controller's keypad. Additionally, pressing 9 on the keypad brings Cutter to shoot the enemies and obstacles alongside the player.

Power-up for the main cannon, bombs and special weapons are dropped by enemies and on every second stage, there is a Circle Reserves base, which grants power-ups as well. After each moon has been completed, the player is sent into a bonus stage where they fly between rings in order to get weapons and the stage is over once they crash into a ring. Extra lives are granted either by points or by finding their corresponding icons.

Plot 
An area in the universe known as the Crescent Galaxy has fallen and the planets within the galaxy have been conquered, guarded by a blockade and put under the rule of an entity only referred as Odd-It, whose sole passion is to turn everything odd like it and now resides on the planet Cosmolite. The main armada in the Crescent Galaxy's chapter of the Interplanetary Defense Squad known as the Circle Reserves have nearly perished when they tried to battle against the entity. Trevor McFur, a corporal in the Circle Reserves along with his female feline partner Cutter, set their coordinates for home and engage at warp nine, seeking to overthrow Odd-It's regime on the planets he has attacked by his own armada. After destroying the four moons that surround Cosmolite, Trevor McFur and Cutter descent into Odd-It's main base on the planet. The two destroy it, saving the Crescent Galaxy in the process and both Trevor McFur and Cutter became household names for the Circle Reserves due to their efforts.

Development and release 
Originally codenamed Side Shooter early in development, Trevor McFur in the Crescent Galaxy was first showcased at Atari's August 1993 press conference at Sunnyvale, California in an early but playable state. A 1993 promotional recording sent by Atari to video game retail stores features the game in a much earlier state with many differences compared to the final release.

Andrew Burgess, best known for his work in S.T.U.N. Runner, worked as a programmer and developed the game's sound engine. Andrew stated that the game was given a short deadline to get the project completed and meet the console's launch before other consoles were launched. He also stated that "the game was built on an evolving platform that was hard to program, with early development features, and a highly inexperienced game development organization at the time".

B.J. West, who is more well known for the unreleased Atari Jaguar CD title Black ICE\White Noise and his work as a graphic artist in The Sims, worked as an animator for various enemies and bosses in the game. It was one of his first works in the video game industry.

Trevor McFur in the Crescent Galaxy was included as part of the Atari 50: The Anniversary Celebration compilation for Nintendo Switch, PlayStation 4, Steam, and Xbox One, marking its first re-release.

Reception 

In their review of Trevor McFur in the Crescent Galaxy, Electronic Gaming Monthly commented "The graphics are very nice, but the game is not very challenging, not to mention the controller cramps your hand," and gave it a 4 out of 10. GamePro panned the game, saying it has generally impressive graphics but shallow, primitive gameplay, elaborating that "You scroll side-view across open, flat, non-interactive backgrounds and shoot hordes of boring, redundant enemies. There is no variance to the speed, and little technique is needed other than moving fast and shooting the right objects".

Notes

References

External links 
 Trevor McFur in the Crescent Galaxy at AtariAge
 Trevor McFur in the Crescent Galaxy at GameFAQs
 Trevor McFur in the Crescent Galaxy at MobyGames

1993 video games
Atari games
Atari Jaguar games
Commercial video games with freely available source code
Fictional felids
Horizontally scrolling shooters
Science fiction video games
Side-scrolling video games
Single-player video games
Shoot 'em ups
Video games about cats
Video games developed in the United States
Video games scored by Alex Rudis
Video games set in outer space
Video games set in the future
Video games set on fictional moons
Video games set on fictional planets